Reem Moussa (born 23 January 1994) is an Egyptian basketball player who currently plays for the Alexandria Sporting Club and the Egyptian national team.

High school

She is a 2011 graduate of Coppell High School. A two-year starter and also averaged 10.2 points, 3.6 rebounds, and 6.7 assists in her senior year.

College
She attended Rice University OWLS. In her junior year (2013-2014), she played in all 30 games, making 25 starts, averaged 3.8 points and 1.6 rebounds while playing 21.6 minutes per game.

As a senior, she played in 26 games, making 12 starts, averaged 4.7 points and 2.2 assists in 16.3 minutes per game. She was named the "Owls Most Improved Player" and also named to the "C-USA Commissioner's Honor Roll".

Professional career 
In 2022, Moussa played for Alexandria Sporting Club and won the 2022 FIBA Africa Women's Champions Cup title. She was named to the All-Tournament Team after the finals.

National Team Career
She was a member of Egypt's National U19 squad that won a bronze medal at the 2012 FIBA Africa Under-18 Championship for Women in Senegal.
She averaged 6.7 points, 2.8 rebounds and 2.5 assists in six games, making three starts.

She also played in the 2021 Women's AfroBasket where she averaged 3.3 points, 2.5 rebounds, and 5 assists.

References

1994 births
Living people
American women's basketball players
Egyptian women's basketball players
Alexandria Sporting Club players
Gezira basketball players
Sportspeople from Cairo
Egyptian emigrants to the United States